Petr Luxa (born 3 March 1972) is a retired professional tennis player from Czech Republic. He mainly played doubles, winning three titles partnering fellow countryman Radek Štěpánek.

Career finals

Doubles (3 titles, 2 runner-ups)

External links
 
 

Czech male tennis players
Czechoslovak male tennis players
Tennis players from Prague
1972 births
Living people